George Fleetwood may refer to:

George Fleetwood (regicide) (1623–1674), English Major-General and one of the Regicides of King Charles I of England
George Fleetwood (Swedish general) (1605–1667), Englishman who became a Swedish general and baron
George Fleetwood (priest), Archdeacon of Totnes in 1713
George Fleetwood (Tavistock MP) (1564–1620), English politician

See also 
Fleetwood baronets
Fleetwood (noble family), mentions several other George Fleetwoods